Alby metro station is a station characterized by the colorful art work inspired by the local petroglyphs. The station is located in Alby, Botkyrka Municipality, on the red line of the Stockholm metro. The station was opened on 12 January 1975 as part of the extension from Fittja to Norsborg. It is 19 km away from Slussen.

References

External links
Images of Alby

Red line (Stockholm metro) stations
Railway stations opened in 1975